Edward M. Green  (1860–1912) was a pitcher in Major League Baseball. He played for the Philadelphia Athletics of the American Association during the 1890 season.

Green began his professional career with in 1884 with Chambersburg and York.  His most productive years in the minors may have been in 1886, 1888 and 1889 when he pitched at least 184 innings each season.  He had an earned run average under 2.69 for each of the three seasons as well.

Green only played one season (1890) in the major leagues. His final two years (1891 and 1892) were spent in the minor leagues.

Sources

1860 births
1912 deaths
Baseball players from New Jersey
Major League Baseball pitchers
19th-century baseball players
Philadelphia Athletics (AA) players
York White Roses players
Long Island A's players
Oswego Starchboxes players
Binghamton Crickets (1880s) players
Buffalo Bisons (minor league) players
Chambersburg (minor league baseball) players
Wilkes-Barre Coal Barons players
Hamilton Hams players
Utica Braves players
Syracuse Stars (minor league baseball) players
Grand Rapids Shamrocks players
Philadelphia Athletics (minor league) players
People from Millville, New Jersey
Sportspeople from Cumberland County, New Jersey